Coach Trip 7 was the seventh series of Coach Trip in the United Kingdom. It was filmed from May until June 2011 (after the UK anti-austerity protests began) and aired from 29 August to 7 October 2011. The length of this series was the same as the previous non-celebrity series but with weekends excluded. The tour began in the UK, before moving to France, Germany, Switzerland, Liechtenstein, Austria, Hungary, the Czech Republic plus for the first time ever Poland and Slovakia. Tour guide Brendan Sheerin, coach driver Paul Donald, narrator Dave Vitty and the coach with registration number MT09 MTT all returned for this series, which was aired on Channel 4 with the airing time reverted to 5:00pm, a similar start to series 1 and a similar end to series 3.

Contestants

Contestants (In Order of Elimination and Withdrawal)
Mark & Laura, Partners from Torquay. (Original 7. Red-carded on Day 1 after the announcement was made that whoever received the most votes that day would be instantly sent home without leaving the UK.) (Shortest stay of any mixed couple on Coach Trip.)
Kyale & Olivia, Flatmates from London. (Joined on Day 2, replacing Mark & Laura. Red-carded on Day 4.)
Tony & Wolfy, Friends from North London. (Original 7. Red-carded on Day 7 for bad behaviour and excessive partying.)
Frankie & Alice, Friends from Yorkshire. (Original 7. Walked on Day 8 after receiving the previous day's yellow card and in protest of Tony & Wolfy being red-carded.)
Helen & Dave, Father and daughter from Barnsley. (Original 7. Red-carded on Day 9.)
Araf & Uzi, Uncle and nephew from Middlesbrough and North London. (Joined on Day 10, replacing Helen & Dave. Red-carded on Day 12.)
Lynne & Steve, Preacher and her husband from ? (Joined on Day 6, replacing Kyale & Olivia. Red-carded on Day 13.)
Linda & Chris, Hairdresser and client from ? (Original 7. Red-carded on Day 14.)
Helen & Daniel, Mother and son from The Wirral. (Joined on Day 14, replacing Araf & Uzi. Red-carded on Day 16.)
Tina & Monica, Friends from Birmingham. (Joined on Day 16, replacing Linda & Chris. Red-carded on Day 19.)
Jamie & Mark, Friends from Newcastle Upon Tyne. (Original 7. Red-carded on Day 21.)
Wayne & Nigel, Salsa dancers from Bristol. (Joined on Day 21, replacing Tina & Monica. Red-carded on Day 23.)
Annette & Martin, Married antique dealers from Cornwall. (Joined on Day 15, replacing Lynne & Steve. Red-carded on Day 24.)
Tom & Anita, Colleagues from Leeds. (Joined on Day 23 replacing Jamie & Mark. Red-carded on Day 26.)
Alison & Ashley, Engaged partners from Bolton. (Original 7. Lasted until Final Day.)
Nathan & Katie, Friends, Cheerleaders and trainee teachers from Brighton (Joined on Day 8, replacing Tony & Wolfy. Winners.)
Bonnie & Sam, Goth girlfriends from Norwich. (Joined on Day 9, replacing Frankie & Alice. Lasted until Final Day.)
Danielle & Lauren, Friends from Blackpool and Hale, Greater Manchester. (Joined on Day 19, replacing Helen & Daniel. Lasted until Final Day.)
Fiona & Oliver, Mother and son from Rochdale (Joined on Day 25, replacing Wayne & Nigel. Lasted until Final Day.)
Stephen & Margaret, Husband and wife from ? (Joined on Day 26, replacing Annette & Martin. Lasted until Final Day.)
Rosemary & Judith, Friends from ? (Joined on Day 28, replacing Tom and Anita. Lasted until Final Day.)

(Note: Contestants in italics yellow-carded without being voted off and left without being voted off).

Voting History

 Indicates that the couple received a yellow card
 Indicates that the couple was red carded off the trip
 Indicates that the couple left the coach due to other reasons than being voted off or being removed from the coach
 Indicates that the couple was immune from any votes cast against them due to it either being their first vote or winning immunity from the vote
 Indicates that the couple were voted as the most popular couple and won series
 Indicates that the couple were voted as the second most popular couple
 Indicates that the couple were voted as the third most popular couple
 Indicates that the couple were voted as the fourth most popular couple

Notes

No post-vote arrivals in series

The Trip Day-by-Day

References

2011 British television seasons
Coach Trip series
Television shows set in Austria
Television shows set in France
Television shows set in Germany
Television shows set in Hungary
Television shows set in Liechtenstein
Television shows set in London
Television shows set in Paris
Television shows set in Poland
Television shows set in Slovakia
Television shows set in Switzerland
Television shows set in the Czech Republic